Eisai To Tairi Mou (Greek: Είσαι Το Ταίρι Μου; English: You're My Mate) is a Greek romance comedy television series aired in the 2001-2002 season by Mega Channel. It was written by Lefteris Papapetrou and directed by Antonis Aggelopoulos. The title song of the series was composed by Stefanos Korkolis, while Paschalis wrote the lyrics and performed it. The series was scheduled to be completed in 25 episodes, but the high viewing figures increased its duration.
 
The series won three awards in "Prosopa" Awards, in categories "Best Comedy Series", "Best Comedy Screenplay" for Lefteris Papapetrou and "Best Supporting Actor" for Aris Servetalis. It also won the audience award for "Best Comedy Series".

Series overview

Plot
Stella and Vicky are two Greek diaspora women who meet in Melbourne. Stella is a short and overweight woman to whom men do not pay attention, while Vicky is tall, thin and beautiful, drawing all the male looks on her. Stella was born and raised in Melbourne with her friend, Toula, who have an atelier. Vicky was born in Greece and came to Australia for business. They both fall in love with Nikos, a scion of a wealthy Greek family of businessmen, who is in Australia on Business. Stella watches him from afar, never having spoken to him, while Vicky meets him in a bar and they become a couple. At the same time, Stella flirts online with Grigoris, a young man from Athens.

Nikos and Vicky get engaged and when the two women travel to Greece, Stella on vacation and Vicky to meet Nikos's family, the latter has the idea of the two of them changing roles. That is, Stella should be presented to Nikos's family as Vicky and their future bride and Vicky should be presented as Stella to Gregory. Stella does not accept, but Vicky finds a way to do so by changing the labels on the suitcases and leaving her alone at the airport. Leaving the arrivals, he meets Nikos's family who are waiting for Vicky and, not knowing what to do, tells them that it is her.

Stella stays with Vicky's in-laws who host her in their villa. Although, they are surprised that Nikos has found a woman so different from the ones he usually finds, Stella wins the hearts of everyone except Aneta, while she falls in love with Sotiris, Nikos's little brother. While Stella lives as Vicky with Nikos's family, Vicky meets Gregory as Stella, whom he falls in love with. But things get even more complicated when Nikos returns from Australia...

Cast

Main 

 Alekos Sissovitis as Nikos (Nick) Bezentakos
 Katerina Lehou as Vicky Seitanidi
 Vasilis Charalabopoulos as Grigoris (Gregory) Kapernaros
 Vicky Stavropoulou as Stella Papalimneou
 Alexis Georgoulis as Sotiris Bezentakos
 Ivoni Maltezou as Vera Bezentakou-Ipsilanti
 Dimitris Kaberidis as Likourgos Bezentakos
 Gerasimos Gennatas as Panagiotis Zigouras
 Aris Servetalis as Lazaros (Lazarus) Karageorgopoulos
 Daphnie Labrogianni as Anneta Bezentakou

Recurring 

 Vasilis Andreopoulos as Nikos (Nick) Ipsilantis
 Vicky Vanita as Emilia (Emily) Ipsilanti
 Sofia Vogiatzaki as Toula
 Theodora Voutsa as Chrisoula
 Panagiotis Filippeos as Miltiades Zigouras

Episodes

 The series aired every Monday, except the last episode which aired Tuesday.

Soundtrack
The music of the titles was composed by Stefanos Korkolis. From the seventeenth episode onwards, in the end titles, the musical composition was enriched with lyrics, which Paschalis wrote and performed. In March 2002, the soundtrack of the series along with the song "Soul Of My Heart" and other variations of it, was released on single. His music and lyrics belong again to Korkolis, while the interpretation was done again by Paschalis.

References

Mega Channel original programming
2001 Greek television series debuts
2002 Greek television series endings
2000s Greek television series
Greek comedy television series
Television shows set in Athens
Television shows set in Melbourne